De bloemen, die de ziel vertroosten  ( The flowers that comfort the soul) is a 1914 Dutch silent drama film directed by Louis H. Chrispijn and produced by Maurits Binger.

Plot
Helena is in love with Louis, her neighbor, to whom she will soon get engaged. In an attempt to stop a runaway horse, Helena gets a disfiguring scar across her face. Louis loses interest and eventually becomes engaged to her sister. Helena loses the will to live and fills her room with hundreds of hyacinths, committing suicide by inhaling the flowers' toxic fumes.

Cast
Mientje Kling as Helena
Christine van Meeteren as Helena's sister	
Jan van Dommelen as Helena's father
Louis van Dommelen	as Louis

References

External links 
 

Dutch silent short films
1914 films
Dutch black-and-white films
1914 drama films
Films directed by Louis H. Chrispijn
Dutch drama films
Silent drama films